John Michael Owen Snodgrass  (12 August 1928 – 4 February 2008) was a British diplomat.

He was educated at Marlborough College and Trinity Hall, Cambridge (MA).

Position held
3rd Sec., Rome, 1953–1956
1st Sec., Beirut, 1960–1963
Consul-General to Jerusalem, 1970–74.
Counsellor British Embassy, South Africa, 1974–77.
Head of South Pacific, Foreign and Commonwealth Office, 1977–80.
Ambassador to Zaire, Congo, Rwanda and Burundi, 1980–83.
Ambassador to Bulgaria, 1983–86.

References

 

1928 births
2008 deaths
People educated at Marlborough College
Alumni of Trinity Hall, Cambridge
Consuls-General of the United Kingdom to Jerusalem
Ambassadors of the United Kingdom to Bulgaria
Ambassadors of the United Kingdom to the Democratic Republic of the Congo
Ambassadors of the United Kingdom to the Republic of the Congo
Ambassadors of the United Kingdom to Rwanda
Ambassadors of the United Kingdom to Burundi
Companions of the Order of St Michael and St George